Dane Blacker (born 6 July 1998) is a Welsh rugby union player who plays for Scarlets regional team as a scrum-half. He is a Wales under-20 international. Blacker has previously played for the Cardiff Blues and Dragons.

Club career
Blacker came through the youth team at Pontypridd RFC, while a member of the Cardiff Blues academy. Blacker made his debut for the Cardiff Blues regional team in 2016.

During the 2017–18 Pro14 season, Blacker joined the Dragons on a short term loan. He appeared twice, scoring on his debut against Ulster.

Ahead of the 2019/20 season, Blacker moved from Cardiff to the Scarlets. Despite competing for the starting shirt with Wales internationals Gareth Davies and Kieran Hardy, Blacker made more starts during the 2020–21 Pro14 season than any other scrum half for the Scarlets. During this season, he was also the Scarlets top try scorer, touching down six times. Blacker was voted Supporters Player of the Month back to back in April and May 2021. He once again won the award in December 2022.

International career
Blacker was part of the Wales U20 team, representing them in 2017 and 2018 in the U20 Six Nations and the World Rugby Under 20 Championship.

He has also represented Wales Sevens at numerous World Rugby Sevens Series events.

Blacker was selected in the Wales squad for the 2022 Autumn Internationals.

Blacker was named on the bench for the Wales team against Georgia for the test on 19 November 2022, but was not substituted on and therefore did not make his test debut. He was not selected for the final test against Australia.

References

External links 
Cardiff Blues profile
Scarlets profile
Wales profile

1998 births
Living people
Cardiff Rugby players
Rugby union players from Ynysybwl
Welsh rugby union players
Dragons RFC players
Scarlets players
Rugby union scrum-halves